State Road 867 (SR 867) and County Road 867 (CR 867) together create a  long road known as McGregor Boulevard in Lee County, Florida, paralleling the Caloosahatchee River between Punta Rassa and Fort Myers. The entire road was formerly state-maintained.

Route description

County Road 867
The southern terminus of Historic State Road 867 (now County Road 867) is located in Punta Rassa at the foot of the Sanibel Causeway, and it is the only access to Punta Rassa and Sanibel Island.  From here, CR 867 is a four-lane divided highway as it travels east from the coast through Mangrove-rich mudflats of San Carlos Bay to Truckland.  After the intersection with CR 869 (Summerlin Road) in Truckland, CR 867 continues northeast to the community of Iona.  In Iona, it intersects with State/County Road 865 (San Carlos Boulevard/Gladiolus Drive), which is where the CR 867 designation ends.

State Road 867
State Road 867 signage begins where CR 867 left off at the SR 865/CR 865 intersection in Iona. It continues in a northeast trajectory to just west of Cypress Lake where it turns to a north–south trajectory.  Just north of Cypress Lake is the intersection the southern terminus of County Road 867A, which crosses the Caloosahatchee River into Cape Coral on the Cape Coral Bridge.  The route continues in the opposite direction as College Parkway.

SR 867 continues north and passes through the communities of McGregor and Whiskey Creek before entering Fort Myers' city limits.  Once in Fort Myers, it terminates at County Road 884 (Colonial Boulevard), Lee County's main east–west thoroughfare.

SR 867 once continued north past CR 884 along McGregor Boulevard, but in the mid 2000s, this segment was relinquished to the city of Fort Myers.  McGregor Boulevard continues north as a city street, passing the Fort Myers Country Club and the Edison and Ford Winter Estates as it enters downtown Fort Myers, before terminating at US 41 (Cleveland Avenue) at the historic Five Points intersection (the former terminus of SR 867, which is also the terminus of State Roads 80 and 82, making a five-way intersection).

History

McGregor Boulevard, originally known as Riverside Avenue, was used historically by cattlemen to run cattle from Fort Myers to Punta Rassa, which was a significant cattle shipping town at the time.  McGregor Boulevard is named after former Standard Oil executive Ambrose McGregor who, along with his wife Tootie, lived next door to Thomas Edison's estate in Fort Myers.

After McGregor's death in 1900, Tootie and her second husband Dr. Marshall Orlando Terry (another local figure who donated land for Terry Park Ballfield) sought to have the road paved.  They offered financial assistance to the county on the condition that it would be named McGregor Boulevard.  Tootie McGregor died before the paving began, and Dr. Terry saw the paving to completion.  McGregor Boulevard was officially completed in 1915.  In honor of Tootie, Dr. Terry had a fountain installed at the north end of McGregor Boulevard at Cleveland Avenue.  The fountain was removed in the early 1960s to accommodate the construction of the Caloosahatchee Bridge and overpass over the intersection.  The fountain was then relocated to Fort Myers Country Club, where it stands today.

In 1923, McGregor Boulevard was designated part of State Road 25, which extended from Punta Rassa to Palm Beach.  It was redesignated as State Road 867 during the 1945 Florida state Road renumbering, with the portion east of US 41 to Palm Beach becoming State Road 80.

Major intersections

County Road 867A

County Road 867A is the primary north–south arterial road for Cape Coral, Florida.  Formerly State Road 867A, it essentially parallels SR 867 on the opposite side of the Caloosahatchee River.

State Road 867A became a major route when the Cape Coral Bridge opened in 1964.  The southern terminus of what was State Road 867A is at an interchange with McGregor Boulevard (SR 867) in McGregor.  From the southern terminus, it travels west and crosses the Caloosahatchee River via the Cape Coral Bridge into Cape Coral, Florida.  At the west side of the Cape Coral Bridge, SR 867A ran along Cape Coral Parkway for only  until an intersection with Del Prado Boulevard. From here, it turned north and followed Del Prado Boulevard northward to its terminus at SR 78 (Pine Island Road)

Since being turned over to the county in the early 1980s, Del Prado Boulevard has been extended north beyond Pine Island Road into North Fort Myers.  North of Pine Island Road, addresses on Del Prado Boulevard have the attached "North" suffix to the name of the road; south of Pine Island Road uses "South." From Pine Island Road, Del Prado Boulevard continues as a city street, though the city of Cape Coral maintains the CR 867A designation.  It intersects Diplomat Parkway and the Kismet Parkway, before intersecting with US 41 (Tamiami Trail) at the northern Cape Coral city limits.    The extension into North Fort Myers was built in the 1990s.

From US 41, Del Prado Boulevard continues east as a rural county road along the northern edge of North Fort Myers.  Just past the Prairie Pines Preserve, it briefly becomes Mellow Drive before it terminates at Slater Road.  Future plans call for Del Prado Boulevard to be extended north from Mellow Drive in North Fort Myers around the Prairie Pines Preserve to Interstate 75 with a new interchange near the Lee-Charlotte County border.  At the southern end, Lee County has also extended the CR 867A designation to include College Parkway toward US 41 near Villas.

Major intersections

References

External links

867
867
Transportation in Fort Myers, Florida